ISO 9 is an international standard establishing a system for the transliteration into Latin characters of Cyrillic characters constituting the alphabets of many Slavic and non-Slavic languages.

Published on February 23, 1995 by the International Organization for Standardization, the major advantage ISO 9 has over other competing systems is its univocal system of one character for one character equivalents (by the use of diacritics), which faithfully represents the original spelling and allows for reverse transliteration, even if the language is unknown.

Earlier versions of the standard, ISO/R 9:1954, ISO/R 9:1968 and ISO 9:1986, were more closely based on the international scholarly system for linguistics (scientific transliteration), but have diverged in favour of unambiguous transliteration over phonemic representation.
The edition of 1995 supersedes the edition of 1986.

ISO 9:1995 

The standard features three mapping tables: the first covers contemporary Slavic languages, the second older Slavic orthographies (excluding letters from the first), and the third non-Slavic languages (including most letters from the first). Several Cyrillic characters included in ISO 9 are not available as pre-composed characters in Unicode, neither are some of the transliterations; combining diacritical marks have to be used in these cases. Unicode, on the other hand, includes some historic characters that are not dealt with in ISO 9.

Transliteration table 
The following combined table shows characters for various Slavic, Iranian, Romance, Turkic, Uralic, Mongolic, Caucasian, Tungusic, Paleosiberian and other languages of the former USSR which are written in Cyrillic.

National adoptions

Sample text 

The following text is a fragment of the Preamble of the Universal Declaration of Human Rights in Bulgarian:

ISO/R 9 

ISO Recommendation No. 9, published 1954 and revised 1968, is an older version of the standard, with different transliteration for different Slavic languages, reflecting their phonemic differences. It is closer to the original international system of Slavist scientific transliteration.

A German adaptation of this standard was published by the Deutsches Institut für Normung as DIN 1460 (1982) for Slavic languages and supplemented by DIN 1460-2 (2010) for non-Slavic languages.

The languages covered are Bulgarian, Russian, Belarusian, Ukrainian, Serbo-Croatian and Macedonian. For comparison, ISO 9:1995 is shown in the table below.

Alternative schemes: ISO/R 9:1968 permits some deviations from the main standard. In the table below, they are listed in the columns alternative 1 and alternative 2.
The first sub-standard defines some language-dependent transliterations for Belarusian (BE), Bulgarian (BG), Russian (RU), and Ukrainian (UK).
The second sub-standard permits, in countries where tradition favours it, a set of alternative transliterations, but only as a group. It is identical to the British Standard 2979:1958 for Cyrillic romanization.

See also
 Romanization of Russian
 List of ISO transliterations
 GOST standards

Notes 
.

External links 
 Transliteration of Non-Roman Scripts – A collection of writing systems and transliteration tables, by Thomas T. Pedersen. PDF reference charts include ISO 9.
 Transliteration of Russian into various European languages
 CyrAcademisator Bi-directional online transliteration of Russian for ALA-LC (diacritics), scientific, ISO/R 9, ISO 9, GOST 7.79B and others. Supports Old Slavonic characters
 Lingua::Translit Perl module covering a variety of writing systems. Transliteration according to several standards including ISO 9 and DIN 1460 for Cyrillic.
 ISO 9 transliteration
  IDS (Informationsverbund Deutschschweiz, 2001) Katalogisierungsregeln IDS (KIDS), Anhänge, "IDS G.4: Transliteration der slavischen kyrillischen Alphabete ". Universität Zürich. URL accessed on 29-02-2012 (in German)—ISO/R 9 1968 standardization of scientific transliteration.
 RUS1.NET — 1:1 (univocal) transliteration map for learners of Russian, links to free auto-translit/IME tools for chrome/Firefox.

00009
00009